"Evergreen" is a song co-written by Jörgen Elofsson, Per Magnusson and David Kreuger, and originally recorded by Irish boy band Westlife. The song appears on their album World of Our Own (2001). It was composed in the traditional verse–chorus form in C major, with nand members Shane Filan and Brian McFadden's vocal ranging from the chords of F#3 to B4.

Credits and personnel

Written by Jörgen Elofsson, Per Magnusson and David Kreuger
Published by BMG Music Publishing / Good Ear Music / Peer Music / Warner-Chappell Music
Produced and arranged by Per Magnusson and David Kreuger for A Side Productions
Co-produced by Jörgen Elofsson
Stockholm Session Orchestra arranged and conducted by Ulf and Henrik Janson
Recorded at Olympic Studios, London, and A Side Productions' Studios, Stockholm
Engineered by Peter Lewis
Assistant engineering by Tim Roe
Orchestra recorded at R.O.A.M. Studios, Stockholm

Orchestra engineered by Fredrik Andersson
Mixed by Bernard Löhr at Olympic Studios, London, and Mono Studios, Stockholm
Keyboards by Per Magnusson
Programming by David Kreuger
Guitars by Esbjörn Öhrwall
Bass by Tomas Lindberg
Backing vocals by Anders von Hofsten, Jeanette Olsson and United Colours of Sound
Mastered by Richard Dowling at Transfermation

Will Young version

In 2002, the song was chosen to be the winner's single for the first series of Pop Idol and was recorded by the show's three finalists: Will Young, Gareth Gates and Darius Danesh. During the final, the song was performed by both Young and Gates. Young went on to win the show, and released "Evergreen" as a double A-side single, along with "Anything Is Possible", which was also recorded by the final three and performed by the final two. The song was later included on Young's debut album, From Now On (2002). Gates' version of the song was also released as a B-side to his single, "Unchained Melody".

Background
"Evergreen" was written by Swedish musicians Jörgen Elofsson, Per Magnusson, and David Kreuger. Westlife was less impressed with Young's version, dismissing the song chosen for the Pop Idol winner as one of the "weakest" on their third studio album World of Our Own (2001). Band member Kian Egan told BBC News: "When we heard the song at first we always knew it was going to be a great song. But when we recorded, it just wasn't a contender for our singles."

Chart performance
"Evergreen" went straight to the number one spot in the UK Singles Chart and stayed there for three consecutive weeks, before being knocked off the top spot by Gates' debut single, "Unchained Melody". It was the best-selling song of 2002 and was also the fastest-selling debut in UK chart history, selling 403,027 copies on its day of release and over 1.1 million copies by the end of the week. The song went on to sell over 1.79 million copies and in 2012 it appeared 14th in the official list of the all-time best-selling singles in the UK. It was the biggest selling single of the 21st century in the UK until 2015,  when it was overtaken by "Happy" by Pharrell Williams.

Music video
A music video for "Evergreen" was filmed in February 2002. In 2011, Young express his dislike of the video in an interview with Elle magazine, saying: "I can't bear "Evergreen" or "Anything is Possible," they're absolutely shocking. And you wouldn't believe the amount of money that was spent on those videos [...] Dreadful videos. At one moment it looks like I'm in love with a tree! Dreadful. Really odd. Dreadful. No, no, no. No."

Track listing

Notes
 signifies a co-producer

Credits and personnel
Credits are lifted from the From Now On album booklet.

 Fredrik Andersson – engineering
 Jörgen Elofsson – co-production, writing
 Henrik Janson – arrangement
 Ulf Janson – arrangement
 David Kreuger – production, programming, writing
 Peter Lewis – engineering
 Tomas Lindberg – bass
 Bernard Löhr – mixing
 Per Magnusson – production, writing
 Esbjörn Öhrwall – guitar
 Jeanette Olsson  – backing vocals  
 Stockholm Session Orchestra – orchestra
 Tim Roe – engineering assistance
 United Colours of Sound  – backing vocals
 Anders von Hofsten – backing vocals

Charts

Weekly charts

Year-end charts

Decade-end charts

Certifications

|}

Release history

References 

2001 songs
2002 debut singles
UK Singles Chart number-one singles
Pop Idol
Gareth Gates songs
Westlife songs
Will Young songs
Songs written by Jörgen Elofsson
Songs written by Per Magnusson
Songs written by David Kreuger
Number-one singles in Scotland
Pop ballads
2000s ballads
Sony BMG singles